Walter James Fenn (6 January 1862 in Brooklyn, New York – 5 July 1961 in Chula Vista, California), usually signing his work as W. J. Fenn, was an American artist and illustrator.

Walter was the son of Mary L. Fenn, an amateur painter. He contributed to St. Nicholas Magazine and Harper’s New Monthly Magazine during the 1880s and 1890s.

Lillian Dee Fenn (1864 - 1947), Mary Fenn (1867 - 1950), Harry Fenn (1845–1911)

Books illustrated
 California Mammals (1906), Frank Stephens

References

American illustrators
1862 births
1961 deaths
Artists from Brooklyn